Barnum Brown (February 12, 1873 – February 5, 1963), commonly referred to as Mr. Bones, was an American paleontologist.  Named after the circus showman P. T. Barnum, he discovered the first documented remains of Tyrannosaurus during a career that made him one of the most famous fossil hunters working from the late Victorian era into the early 20th century.

Fossil dinosaur expeditions 

Sponsored by the American Museum of Natural History (AMNH), Brown traversed the country bargaining and trading for fossils.  His field was not limited to dinosaurs.  He was known to collect or obtain anything of possible scientific value.  Often, he simply sent money to have fossils shipped to the AMNH, and any new specimen of interest often resulted in a flurry of letters between the discoverer and Brown.

After working a handful of years in Wyoming for AMNH in the late 1890s, Brown led an expedition to the Hell Creek Formation of southeastern Montana.  There, in 1902, he discovered and excavated the first documented remains of Tyrannosaurus rex.

The Hell Creek digs produced extravagant quantities of fossils, enough to fill up whole train cars.  As was common practice then, Brown's crews used controlled blasts of dynamite to remove the tons of rock covering their fossil discoveries.  Everything was moved with horse-drawn wagons and pure manpower. Seldom were any site data recorded.
 
After nearly a decade in Montana, Brown headed to Alberta, Canada, and the Red Deer River near Drumheller. There, Brown and his crew spent the middle 1910s floating down the river on a flatboat, stopping along the way to prospect for fossils at promising-looking sites.  Trying to outdo them along the same stretch of river was the famous Sternberg family of fossil hunters. A playful, friendly rivalry arose between the Browns and the Sternbergs, and their competing discoveries went down in the annals of paleontology.

In 1910, in one of their most significant finds, Brown's team uncovered several hind feet from a group of Albertosaurus in Dry Island Buffalo Jump Provincial Park. For years, the fossils were largely forgotten in the recesses of the American Museum of Natural History in New York City. In the 1990s, Dr. Phil Currie, then head of dinosaur research at the Royal Tyrrell Museum of Palaeontology in Canada, relocated the site of the bones using only an old photograph as a guide. He recommenced excavations there in the summer of 1998, and examination of the site under the Tyrrell Museum's auspices lasted until August, 2005. However, after Currie took a new job at the University of Alberta, a new crew began working at the site in 2006, intending to continue for several years.

An homage to Brown was in the 1998 IMAX film T-Rex: Back to the Cretaceous, in which he was played by actor Laurie Murdoch.

Earliest anthropoid discovery 

In early 1923, Brown travelled with his then-wife Lilian to Yangon, the capital of what was then Burma. Brown focused his fossil prospection along areas of Pondaung Sandstone. A mandible with three teeth was recorded and catalogued at an exposure of sandstone outside of the town of Mogaung. He did not recognise the significance of his find until 14 years later, when Edwin H. Colbert, of the AMNH, identified the fossil as a new species of primate and the earliest known anthropoid in the world. He named the holotype Amphipithecus mogaungensis, or the ape-like creature of Mogaung, but considerable debate remains regarding its status as a primate and the lack of fossils compounds this issue.

Public persona 

Brown lived at the tail end of an unprecedented age of scientific discovery, and was one of its more colorful practitioners.  At dig sites in Canada, Brown was frequently photographed wearing a large fur coat.

During World War I and World War II, he worked as an "intelligence asset". During his many trips abroad, he was not above picking up spare cash acting as a corporate spy for oil companies.

Personal life 

Barnum went to highschool in Carbondale, Kansas. After highschool, he attended the University of Kansas.

Brown's second wife, Lilian MacLaughlin Brown, wrote a book of memoirs, I Married a Dinosaur (Dodd Mead, 1950), about her expeditions with her husband. She also wrote Bring 'em back petrified (1950)  about a Guatemala expedition, and Cleopatra Slept Here (Dodd Mead, 1951).

Brown was buried in Oxford, New York, the hometown of his first wife, Marion Raymond. Their daughter, Frances Raymond Brown, raised by the Raymonds, was dean of residence and student affairs at Radcliffe College at the time of her father's death.

References

Sources
 Barnum Brown: Dinosaur Hunter, Walker Books for Young Readers (2006) 
 Archival Field Notebooks of Paleontological Expeditions – American Museum of Natural History
 Fossil Ancestors of Burma (1985)
 Bones for Barnum Brown: Adventures of a Dinosaur Hunter (1985) 
 Tyrannosaurus Rex & Barnum Brown (Dinosaurs & Their Discoverers Series) by Brooke Hartzog (1999) 
 A Triceratops Hunt In Pioneer Wyoming: The Journals of Barnum Brown & J.P. Sams: The University of Kansas Expedition of 1895 (2004) 
 Barnum Brown: The Man Who Discovered Tyrannosaurus Rex by Lowell Dingus and Mark A. Norell (2010)

External links
 
 

American paleontologists
American taxonomists
1873 births
1963 deaths
Hell Creek Formation
Paleozoologists
People associated with the American Museum of Natural History
People from Osage County, Kansas
Scientists from Kansas
20th-century American zoologists